The 1974 French Open was a tennis tournament that took place on the outdoor clay courts at the Stade Roland Garros in Paris, France. The tournament ran from  3 June until 16 June. It was the 78th staging of the French Open, and the second Grand Slam tennis event of 1974.

Connors and Goolagong
World no. 2 Jimmy Connors and Evonne Goolagong were banned from playing in the 1974 French Open by Philippe Chatrier, president of the French Tennis Federation (FTF), because both had signed contracts to play in the World Team Tennis league in the United States. The schedule of the inaugural edition of the World Team Tennis conflicted with the dates of several European spring tournaments including the Italian and French Open. Both players had won the singles title at the 1974 Australian Open and were thus denied the opportunity to play for the Grand Slam that year. Connors and Goolagong filed a suit at a French court seeking the right to participate but this was rejected on the grounds that there was no need for emergency action. In September 1974 they sued the FTF seeking $200,000 in damages each as compensation for the ban. This wouldn't be until the 2017 French Open that both of the defending champions of that year's Australian Open also absent from the competition.

Finals

Men's singles 

 Björn Borg defeated  Manuel Orantes, 2–6, 6–7(4–7), 6–0, 6–1, 6–1 
It was Borg's 1st career Grand Slam title.

Women's singles 

 Chris Evert defeated  Olga Morozova, 6–1, 6–2 
It was Evert's 1st career Grand Slam title.

Men's doubles 

 Dick Crealy /  Onny Parun defeated  Bob Lutz /  Stanley Smith, 6–3, 6–2, 3–6, 5–7, 6–1

Women's doubles 

 Chris Evert /  Olga Morozova defeated  Gail Sherriff Chanfreau /  Katja Burgemeister Ebbinghaus, 6–4, 2–6, 6–1

Mixed doubles 

 Martina Navratilova /  Iván Molina defeated  Rosie Reyes Darmon /  Marcello Lara, 6–3, 6–3

Prize money

Total prize money for the event was FF407,000.

Notes

References

External links
 French Open official website

 
1974 Grand Prix (tennis)
1974 in French tennis
1974 in Paris